Opatowice may refer to the following places in Poland:
Opatowice, Lower Silesian Voivodeship (south-west Poland)
Opatowice, Kuyavian-Pomeranian Voivodeship (north-central Poland)